Serine/threonine-protein kinase Nek6 is an enzyme that in humans is encoded by the NEK6 gene.

Function 

The Aspergillus nidulans 'never in mitosis A' (NIMA) gene encodes a serine/threonine kinase that controls initiation of mitosis. NIMA-related kinases (NEKs) are a group of protein kinases that are homologous to NIMA. Evidence suggests that NEKs perform functions similar to those of NIMA.

It is a protein kinase which plays an important role in mitotic cell cycle progression. Required for chromosome segregation at metaphase-anaphase transition, robust mitotic spindle formation and cytokinesis. Phosphorylates ATF4, CIR1, PTN, RAD26L, RBBP6, RPS7, RPS6KB1, TRIP4, STAT3 and histones H1 and H3. Phosphorylates KIF11 to promote mitotic spindle formation. Involved in G2/M phase cell cycle arrest induced by DNA damage. Inhibition of activity results in apoptosis. May contribute to tumorigenesis by suppressing p53/TP53-induced cancer cell senescence.

Interactions 

NEK6 has been shown to interact with NEK9.

References

Further reading 

 
 
 
 
 
 
 
 
 
 
 
 
 
 

Human proteins